Selapiu Island is an island of Papua New Guinea, located immediately south of the corner of New Hanover Island.

References

Islands of Papua New Guinea